The Professional Bull Riders, Inc. (PBR) is an international professional bull riding organization based in Pueblo, Colorado, United States. In the U.S., PBR events have been televised on CBS and CBS Sports Network since 2012. In 2013, the PBR and CBS signed a contract that extended CBS Sport's partnership with PBR, making them the primary sports broadcaster for PBR. Also in 2013, the PBR was acquired by WME-IMG. In 2018, the PBR launched RidePass; its own subscription-based video on demand service that live-streams PBR events, as well as PBR-produced events for other western sport organizations. On July 20, 2021, RidePass switched from a subscription-based streaming service to a free, ad-supported streaming channel on Pluto TV. More than 500 cowboys from the United States, Canada, Mexico, Brazil, Australia and other countries hold PBR memberships.

History
The organization began in mid-April 1992 through the efforts of 20 professional bull riders and a businessman who gathered in a hotel room in Scottsdale, Arizona. They all rode in the Professional Rodeo Cowboys Association (PRCA), the top rodeo organization in the world which had been around for many years, as well as Bull Riders Only (BRO), an all-bull riding organization that had been in existence for just one year. Each rider contributed $1,000 to forming the Professional Bull Riders (PBR). This group was seeking to break away from the rules set by the PRCA and BRO, and form their own bull riding competitions, which included them as well as other top bull riders. "We wanted to create a better product for the fans, so that when they tuned in they were seeing the best of the best every time," said PBR co-founder and nine-time world champion rodeo cowboy Ty Murray, who later served as the president. In 2007, investment firm Spire Capital Partners acquired a majority stake in PBR and turned those founders’ $1,000 into millions. In April 2015, Endeavor (then-known as WME-IMG), a global leader in several industries, bought the PBR.

The PBR put on a small series of events in 1993 and had its first championship season in 1994 with the Bud Light Cup Series (BLC). The organization has since grown to include five tours in the United States which stage over 100 events every year. Prize money for contestants had exploded from over $330,000 in 1994 to over $11 million in 2008.

The original CEO of the PBR was Sam Applebaum. Randy Bernard became CEO of the PBR in 1995, a position he held until he resigned in 2010 to become the CEO of INDYCAR. When Bernard took over the position of CEO in 1995, it was just after the conclusion of the first World Finals at the MGM Grand Garden Arena in Las Vegas, Nevada. At that time, the PBR's bank account held $8,000. It was $140,000 in debt. Bernard, a bold and wise businessman, quickly went to work. At the end of his first year, he turned things around. The World Finals paid out $1 million, and increased to $1.5 million in 1999. 

In 1996, the PBR made bull riding protective vests, which were introduced three years earlier, mandatory for all contestants at their events. The same was done for bull riders in all other organizations. 

After a few years of rivalry between BRO and PBR, the former organization officially went out of business in the spring of 1998. 

In 2001, one month after that year’s World Finals, the PBR held the Bud Light World Challenge in Austin, Texas, which featured the top riders from the 2001 year-end world standings, as well as some international invitees. 

2002 was the last year in which PBR bullfighters wore traditional make-up and baggy outfits. Beginning with the 2003 season, they now wore sport jerseys and shorts that featured corporate sponsor logos.

Also in 2003, the elite Bud Light Cup Series changed title sponsors and became the Built Ford Tough Series (BFTS). In the past, PBR world champions received a year-end money bonus, but starting this year, they received a $1 million bonus. Chris Shivers was the first world champion to claim that bonus.

In 2005, the PBR opened offices in Canada, Mexico, Brazil and Australia to produce tours in said countries starting the next year.

In 2003, the PBR purchased Buckers, Inc.; an organization that documented bucking bulls’ lineages and put on futurity events for young bulls that would potentially be used for professional rodeo or bull riding events. They renamed it as American Bucking Bull, Inc. (ABBI) and continued with its practices. The ABBI holds several futurity events in the United States every year and the ABBI Finals has been held every autumn since 2004 in Las Vegas, Nevada. In subsequent years, the ABBI expanded to having futurity events as well as year-end finals in Canada, Australia, and Brazil. After a few years, ABBI Brazil was discontinued. The ABBI was also planning to hold events in Mexico. However, that project has yet to take off. 

In 2006, just shortly after that year’s World Finals, the PBR held two events in Hawaii. The first was a regular lower-level event in Wailuku, followed by an event in Honolulu which featured the top 15 riders from the 2006 year-end world standings, as well as five  riders that were voted online by fans to compete at the event.

The PBR was originally headquartered in Irvine, California before moving to downtown Colorado Springs, Colorado in 1995. By 2007, the organization had enough of its cramped office in Colorado Springs, so they moved their world headquarters to a new 4-story building just outside Pueblo, Colorado.

In 2008, the PBR launched the Bull Team Challenge; a series of events in which stock contractors bucked a certain number of bulls at select Built Ford Tough Series events to try to earn money and points for their respective teams. At the beginning of the year, 22 bull teams chipped in $50,000 a piece for their opportunity to win their share of the $1.1 million total competition purse. Out of the 33 Built Ford Tough Series stops held that year, 17 were Bull Team Challenge events, including the PBR World Finals. Each stop had between five and eight bull teams that included five bulls, plus two alternates per team. Each team could only compete in five events. At each Bull Team Challenge stop, the first place team won $20,000, while second place won $10,000. The top bull teams then competed at the PBR World Finals for a $500,000 purse, with $250,000 going to the champion team. The PBR discontinued the Bull Team Challenge after just one year. However, the concept was picked up by another bull riding organization, Championship Bull Riding (CBR) in 2010, and the CBR Bull Team Challenge hosted several bull teams competing at regular events, as well as the CBR World Finals. The bull teams racked up points and money and from 2010 to 2018, a year-end CBR Bull Team Challenge champion was crowned. After CBR went out of business in the summer of 2018, the CBR Bull Team Challenge was renamed the Million Dollar Bull Team Challenge (MDBTC) and returned to its roots by rejoining the PBR. MDBTC events now take place primarily at lower-level PBR events.       

In the summer of 2008, the PBR Team Shootout was held. This was a series of five events in which the top 20 riders in the PBR world standings each selected a rider of their choice, and as a team competed against each other for the Team Shootout championship. Each team rode in two of the first four events, held respectively in Del Mar, California; Paso Robles, California; Molalla, Oregon; and Guthrie, Oklahoma. Then, the top 10 teams rode at the finals event in Pueblo, Colorado. 

2009 was the first year in which most of the contestants on the PBR’s televised elite series rode with helmets instead of cowboy hats.

In 2010, just shortly before the start of that year’s World Finals, the PBR held an event in New York City’s Times Square which featured the top 10 riders competing for the chance to receive additional points towards the world standings.  

On February 23, 2011, the PBR announced that Jim Haworth had become its new CEO. Then on June 29, 2015, the PBR announced that Haworth was promoted to Chairman, while COO Sean Gleason had become the new CEO.

In 2013, the PBR made it mandatory that all contestants at their events who were born on or after October 15, 1994 ride with a full bull riding helmet. Those born before that date were grandfathered in and permitted to ride with a protective face mask underneath their cowboy hat or simply with their cowboy hat if so desired.

In 2014, just shortly before that year’s World Finals, the PBR held an event at a beach in Huntington Beach, California which featured the top 15 riders attempting to gain additional points towards the world standings.

In 2018, the elite series changed title sponsors once again and the Unleash the Beast Series (UTB) tour name replaced the Built Ford Tough Series (BFTS) tour name. It was also now referred to as the Premier Series. That same year, the PBR celebrated its 25th championship season and awarded another $11 million in prize money, which included the bonus to the World Champion Bull Rider of $1 million and the $20,000 gold belt buckle.

In mid-March 2020, because of the COVID-19 pandemic, several events were either canceled or rescheduled to later dates. In the spring, the PBR held three UTB events at the Lazy E Arena in Guthrie, Oklahoma, and all were closed to the public to avoid the spread of the virus. In the summer, the organization held the Monster Energy Team Challenge, a series of events in which several teams of four riders competed against each other, and each team was represented by a corporate sponsor. The regular events were held at the South Point Hotel Arena & Equestrian Center in Las Vegas, while the series finale was held at the Denny Sanford Premier Center in Sioux Falls, South Dakota. While the regular events were closed to the public, the championship event allowed fans to attend, but in limited numbers and they had to socially distance themselves.  For the rest of the year, PBR events consisted of limited and socially distanced crowds, including the World Finals.   

Since 2020, the PBR has held Cowboys for a Cause; an event that features sponsored teams of three bull riders competing against each other in a winner-take-all format while donating money to charitable causes. During its first two years, the event took place on the launch deck of the USS Lexington in Corpus Christi, Texas and was held in conjunction with the Air Force Reserve to support military causes in Texas. The 2020 event took place in the autumn, after the conclusion of that year’s PBR World Finals, while the one in 2021 took place on Labor Day Weekend. The 2022 edition took place at King Ranch in Kingsville, Texas, also during Labor Day Weekend and donations from that event went towards conservation and sustainability efforts across Texas. A donation to the Texas and Southwestern Cattle Raisers Association was also included and the money was to be distributed to multiple local and rural fire departments that helped landowners fight wildfires across Texas earlier in the year.

Las Vegas, Nevada was home to the PBR World Finals for over 25 years. The PBR hosted its inaugural World Finals in 1994 at the city’s MGM Grand Garden Arena. They remained at the arena through 1998. In 1999, the PBR moved their World Finals to the Thomas & Mack Center. The PBR was stretching its current arena's limits and really needed a bigger arena. They wanted to stay in Las Vegas, so the Thomas & Mack Center was the place to go. The PBR World Finals was held at the Thomas & Mack Center in from 1999 until 2015. The 2015 World Finals was the 17th and last time the event was hosted at the venue. In 2016, the PBR moved their World Finals event  to the T-Mobile Arena on the Las Vegas Strip. In 2020, as a result of the COVID-19 pandemic and Nevada state restrictions on large events, the PBR World Finals were moved  to AT&T Stadium in Arlington, Texas with a limited and socially distanced crowd for every day of competition. The event returned to T-Mobile Arena in Las Vegas for the final time in 2021. The PBR World Finals relocated to Dickies Arena in Fort Worth, Texas in 2022.

From 2007 to 2010, the PBR hosted a team competition format called the PBR World Cup, where 25 bull riders (altogether representing the five countries where PBR events are sanctioned) competed to win the title of best bull riding country in the world. Since 2017, another event, the PBR Global Cup, again offers bull riders a chance to compete in a five country competition. This new event is a different format from the PBR World Cup; it is not a continuation of the old event. It is staged annually across the five PBR countries: Australia, Brazil, Canada, Mexico and United States. National team riders are matched against the best of each. The home country is granted a competitive advantage. It is a series that visits each nation each year and continues until one nation holds all five pieces of the Global Cup—including the native soil of each territory. Thus, only one country can claim The Toughest Nation on Dirt.

On November 5, 2021, a new series of competitions was announced: the PBR Team Series. The series debuted in 2022 and will run from the summer to autumn of every year. The teams and their respective owners were announced on January 6, 2022, while the Team Series schedule was later announced on March 4 of that year. In said series, there are eight teams representing different regions of the United States which go head-to-head against each other in events in each of the teams’ respective hometowns, as well as a few “neutral site” events. The team with the highest total combined points among its riders after the conclusion of each event is the champion. The season culminates with a championship event which is held at T-Mobile Arena in Las Vegas. The year-end champion team wins a $700,000 bonus and a trophy shaped like a giant belt buckle. Each individual member of the champion team also wins a $150,000 bonus and a regular-sized championship gold buckle.

The trophy cup that the PBR’s annual individual world champion receives in addition to the gold buckle and money bonus was originally called the Bud Light Cup from 1994 to 2002. However, when Bud Light was no longer the elite series’ title sponsor by 2003, it was referred to simply as the PBR Cup or PBR Championship Trophy. In 2022, the trophy cup was officially renamed the Jerome Robinson Cup, in honor of legendary bull rider and longtime PBR arena director Jerome Robinson, who passed away early in the year.

In September 2022, it was announced that the PBR Hall of Fame would open in Spring 2023 at the National Cowboy & Western Heritage Museum in Oklahoma City, Oklahoma within the museum’s American Rodeo Gallery and would expand to be completed by 2024 or 2025.

From June through August 2022, the PBR hosted lower-level tour events on Sundays at Cowtown Coliseum in Fort Worth, Texas. Beginning in 2023, these events now take place at the venue on most Thursdays of the calendar year. Cowtown Coliseum was the site of the very first PBR event in April 1993.

Organization 
More than 500 cowboys from the United States, Canada, Mexico, Brazil, Australia, and other countries hold PBR memberships, and compete in PBR-sanctioned events in the five mentioned countries. At the end of each season, the PBR world champion receives a $1 million bonus, trophy cup, and championship gold belt buckle. 

The PBR has become one of the most globally successful television sports programs. The PBR Premier Series in the United States is televised on CBS, CBS Sports Network, and other networks around the globe. PBR television broadcasts now reach half a billion households in 130 territories around the world. A new digital network named RidePass that started in February 2018 as a subscription-based streaming service before switching to a free, ad-supported streaming channel on Pluto TV in July 2021 adds hundreds of hours of PBR bull riding and other western sports to anytime availability in the United States. PBR’s international tours in Canada, Brazil, and Australia are televised in their respective countries. Since November 2022, American PBR events are streamed outside the U.S. on the PBR Live channel on the streaming service Recast. 

Total viewership, including event attendees and the television audience, grew 52 percent between 2002 and 2004. In 2004, 16.4 million fans watched or attended a PBR event. By 2008, over 100 million watched the PBR on television, and over 1.7 million attended a live event. In 1995, roughly 310,000 fans attended an event. Now, around 3 million fans attend a live event.

Competition 
A qualified ride is worth up to 100 points. That is, 50 points for the rider and 50 points for the bull when he successfully rides the bull for 8 seconds. An event has four judges, all former bull riders themselves. Each judge may award up to 25 points. Two judges score the rider, and two judges score the bull. All of the judges' scores are tallied together. That figure is divided by two for the official score. One-half of the possible score is based on the bull's performance. The two judges score the bull on how rank (difficult to ride) he is. Two judges score the rider on how proficient he is. The rider has to stay on top of the bull for 8 seconds. The rider has to ride with one free hand. He is disqualified if he touches himself or the bull with his free arm. Any ride that is scored 90 points or higher is deemed exceptional. The highest score in the PBR is 98.75 points. Each Premier Series event always has four judges. At the end of each event, the top 12 riders compete in the Championship Round; the rider with the highest point total from the entire event becomes the champion.

PBR tours 
The PBR started their inaugural championship season in 1994 with one tour. Today, it offers five tours in the United States. Eligibility of contestants at each level is based on previous performance.

Current U.S. tours

Premier Series 
The Premier Series is where the best riders and bulls compete, and it culminates at the PBR World Finals at the end of the regular season. Due to sponsorship changes, the Premier Series has had different titles throughout its history. It was known as the Bud Light Cup Series (BLC) from 1994 to 2002, the Built Ford Tough Series (BFTS) from 2003 to 2017, and since 2018 has been known as the Unleash the Beast Series (UTB). 

The PBR World Finals were held in Las Vegas, Nevada for over a quarter century. They were held at the city’s MGM Grand Garden Arena from 1994 to 1998, the Thomas & Mack Center from 1999 to 2015, and T-Mobile Arena from 2016 to 2019. In 2020, due to COVID-19 restrictions, the World Finals were relocated to AT&T Stadium in Arlington, Texas. The World Finals returned to Las Vegas’ T-Mobile Arena for the final time in 2021.     

In the past, the Premier Series schedule lasted the regular calendar year, with the concluding PBR World Finals taking place in the autumn. However, by 2022, the Premier Series schedule was shortened, running from winter to spring. Also, the PBR World Finals now take place at Dickies Arena in Fort Worth, Texas.

Touring Pro Division 
In 1995, the PBR launched the Touring Pro Division; a minor league tour that allowed riders to compete at lower-level events to work their way up to the elite series. In 2001, the Touring Pro Division was renamed as the Challenger Tour. In subsequent years, the PBR would launch other lower-level tours: the Enterprise Tour and the Discovery Tour. Money won on these two tours counted towards the Challenger Tour standings. On January 1, 2010, the PBR announced the discontinuation of the Enterprise and Discovery tours and the Challenger Tour was changed back to its original title of the Touring Pro Division. 

The Touring Pro Division schedule used to last throughout the regular calendar year. However, as of 2022, like the Premier Series, now runs from winter through spring.

From 1995 to 2012, the year-end champion of this tour was the rider who won the most money throughout the season. From 2013 to 2021, it was the rider who won the most points throughout the season. Throughout its history, the finals event for this tour was held respectively in different locations such as Guthrie, Oklahoma; Denver, Colorado; Columbus, Ohio; Oklahoma City, Oklahoma; and Atlanta, Georgia. 2009 was the last year in which this tour had a season-ending finals event.

Velocity Tour 
Since 2014, The Velocity Tour features young and up-coming talent competing against the established talent of the sport, bringing events to cities across the United States that are not included in the Premier Series. Every winner of a Velocity Tour regular-season event is seeded at one Premier Series event during the season, and if that rider wins enough points at the Premier Series event, he has the chance to earn a full-time spot in said tour. 

The Velocity Tour Finals take place a few days before the start of the PBR World Finals. During its first year in 2014, there was no Velocity Tour finals event, and the year-end champion was the rider who won the most points throughout the season after the completion of the last event of the year. However, there has been a Velocity Tour Finals since 2015. The first Velocity Tour Finals in said year was held at the KFC Yum! Center in Louisville, Kentucky. From 2016 to 2019, the Velocity Tour Finals took place at the South Point Hotel Arena & Equestrian Center in Las Vegas, Nevada. In 2020, due to COVID-19 restrictions, the finals were moved to the Denny Sanford Premier Center in Sioux Falls, South Dakota. The 2021 Velocity Tour Finals returned to the South Point Hotel Arena & Equestrian Center in Las Vegas for the final time. In 2022, the Velocity Tour Finals moved to the American Bank Center Arena in Corpus Christi, Texas to be held in conjunction with the World Champions Rodeo Alliance (WCRA) sanctioned Rodeo Corpus Christi, and like the Premier Series and Touring Pro Division, the Velocity Tour now takes place from winter to spring after having previously taken place throughout the regular calendar year and concluding in the autumn.

Team Series 
Debuting in 2022, the PBR Team Series features eight teams of bull riders competing against each other. In its inaugural season, there were two pre-season events. They were then followed by ten regular season events, including eight of them taking place in each respective team’s hometowns, as well as two “neutral site” events. The season culminates with a championship event at T-Mobile Arena in Las Vegas, Nevada. The PBR Team Series runs from the summer to autumn of every year. 

The teams are as follows:

Challenger Series 
Also new in 2022, the Challenger Series runs from the summer through autumn and works as a way for riders to compete at PBR events in the United States as individuals during the Team Series season. Riders that are members of a Team Series squad can compete at Challenger Series events when there is not a Team Series event scheduled on the same weekend. This tour also works as a series of scouting events for Team Series managements looking to add riders as alternates to their teams in cases of riders on the protected rosters getting injured or in cases of riders getting traded to different teams. 

The Challenger Series Championship takes place at the South Point Arena & Equestrian Center in Las Vegas, Nevada; one day before the start of the PBR Team Series Championship at Las Vegas’ T-Mobile Arena.

International tours 
Since 2006, Canada, Brazil, Australia, and Mexico have each had their own PBR tours and finals events that crown year-end champions for each respective country. In 2014, a PBR-sanctioned event was held in New Zealand. 

Note: Previously, points won by riders at all levels of PBR competition, American and international, counted towards the world standings for the PBR world championship. However, beginning in 2023, only points won on the U.S. Premier Series will count towards the world championship race. Points won on the U.S. lower-level tours and international circuits leading up to and including the Velocity Tour Finals will be jumbled together into what is now known as the Velocity Global standings, which will count towards the Velocity Tour championship race.

U.S. television and streaming

1993-2002: The Nashville Network (TNN) began televising a small number of PBR-sanctioned events in 1993. The following year, the PBR had its first official season that included a year-end world finals event with TNN remaining the organization's official channel. TNN changed its name from The Nashville Network to The National Network late in the 2000 season. After the 2001 season, a special PBR event, the Bud Light World Challenge (which would be a precursor to the PBR’s World Cup, and eventually Global Cup) was televised on NBC. The last regular season event of 2002 was televised on CBS. TNN remained the PBR elite series’ primary channel through  the 2002 PBR World Finals.

2003-2012: The PBR was now primarily televised on the Outdoor Life Network (OLN) with select events being televised on NBC. From 2003 to 2006, select events were also televised on Telemundo. OLN televised the 2004 PBR Challenger Tour Finals. In the middle of the 2006 season, OLN changed its name to Versus and it remained the PBR's primary channel through the 2011 season. The championship round of the last regular season event of 2007 was televised on Fox. Versus televised the 2007 and 2008 Challenger Series Finals. In the summer of 2008, the PBR Team Shootout, a series of five events in which duo teams of riders competed against each other was televised, with the four regular events being televised on ESPN2, while the championship event was televised on ESPN. In 2012, CBS Sports Network became the PBR's primary channel, while CBS broadcast network televised the 15/15 Bucking Battles; a new competition that featured the top 15 PBR riders at the time of competition against 15 of the top PBR bulls in a select regular-season elite series event that gave the riders an opportunity to earn additional points. That same year, Versus became NBC Sports Network and select PBR events were also televised on said channel.

2013-present: CBS Sports Network televises the regular-season Premier Series events and the World Finals, while CBS broadcast network televises the 15/15 Bucking Battles. In 2018, the PBR launched RidePass; its own subscription-based video-on-demand service that live-streams Premier Series and lower-level tour events, as well as PBR-produced events for other western sport organizations. From 2018 to 2020, PBR events were also live-streamed on the subscription-based video-on-demand service, FloRodeo, owned by FloSports. In the summer of 2021, RidePass went from a subscription-based streaming service to a free, ad-supported streaming channel on Pluto TV. PBR content on Pluto TV is available through the PBR RidePass linear channel, as well as on demand. Since 2022, PBR events have also been streamed on Paramount+. Also beginning that year, the PBR Team Series has been televised on CBS Sports Network, CBS broadcast network, and streamed on Pluto TV and Paramount+. 

Note: The PBR’s international tours in Canada, Brazil, and Australia are televised in their respective countries. Since November 2022, U.S. PBR events are streamed abroad on the PBR Live channel on the streaming service Recast.

Current statistics 
The PBR web site tracks many statistics regarding the performances of bull riders and bulls during the season and throughout its history. There is the 90-Points Club, which has been tracking rides that have been scored over 90 points since 1998. Then there is the high marked bull ride statistic, which has been tracked for many seasons. Each season it tracks the highest bull scores throughout and until the Finals have concluded. And then there is the all time money earners statistic, which tallies the bull riders in order of who has earned the most money in their careers. Additionally, the success rate for an 8-second ride was 46 percent in 1995, had dropped to 26 percent by 2012, then climbed roughly 3 percent to about 29 percent for 2017 and 2018. This lower modern rate has been attributed to the selective breeding of bulls.

90-Point Club
In 2002, the U.S. Smokeless Tobacco Company developed the original 90-Point Club. Each contestant who scored 90 or more at a Bud Light Cup Series event shared in bonus money of $90,000. The money was distributed after the World Finals event. It was divided equally by all the qualified rides. The competitor with the most 90-point rides received an additional bonus of $10,000. That competitor also became the 90-Point Club Champion. In 2003, it was added that for each 90-point ride that a bull makes, the stock contractor received $1,000. For that $1,000, half came from the U.S. Smokeless Tobacco Company and the other half came from B&W Trailer Hitches.

The first statistic kept is the most 90-point rides since 1998. Chris Shivers holds first place with 94 rides; J.B. Mauney is in second place with 75 rides; Justin McBride is at third place at 74 rides; Jose Vitor Leme holds fourth place with 62 rides; and Guilherme Marchi is at fifth place with 51 rides. Shivers, McBride and Marchi are all retired, and since 2021, Mauney has decided to ride full-time in the Professional Rodeo Cowboys Association (PRCA) circuit, so all their numbers will stay the same. New for 2018 was the most 90 point rides for the year and the contractor 90 point rides for the year. Lastly, are the historic 90 points rides trailing all the way back to 1998. They are ordered by the highest to lowest ride score. The rides list the rider, the bull, the contractor, the location, and the ride score.

High-marked bull
These statistics keep track of the current season's elite tour event's high marked bulls. B.O.T. stands for buck off time. Each event has a high-marked bull. The top 100 bulls scores are also tracked here.

Highest scored ride

The perfect score in bull riding is 100 points. For several years, the highest score in the PBR was 96.5 points, which was achieved four times. The mark was originally set by Bubba Dunn, who rode Promise Land (owned by Terry Williams) at the 1999 Bud Light Cup event in Tampa, Florida. The record was later tied in 2000 by Chris Shivers, who rode Jim Jam (owned by Logan & Williams) also at the Bud Light Cup event in Tampa. Shivers would repeat the score in 2001 when he rode Dillinger (owned by Herrington Cattle Company) in Las Vegas, Nevada at the PBR World Finals. The most recent 96.5 point ride was in 2004, when Michael Gaffney rode Little Yellow Jacket (owned by Berger Bucking Bulls) at the Built Ford Tough Series event in Nampa, Idaho. 

In 2021, new records for third highest, second highest, and highest scored rides in PBR history were all set on the same bull, Woopaa (owned by Barker Bucking Bulls and Hookin’ W Ranch). The new record for highest scored ride was originally set in the summer, when Jose Vitor Leme rode Woopaa for 97.75 points at the Unleash the Beast event in Tulsa, Oklahoma. A new record for second-highest score in PBR history was later set in the autumn when Dalton Kasel rode Woopaa for 96.75 points at the Unleash the Beast event in San Antonio, Texas. The record for highest scored ride in PBR history was later broken at the World Finals when Jose Vitor Leme rode Woopaa for 98.75 points.

Highest bull score

Even though riders receive no score if they buck off their bulls before the required eight seconds, bulls receive scores for every outing, with the perfect bull score being 50 points. The highest bull score in PBR history, 49 points, was achieved twice; the first time being in 2000 when Hercules (owned by Flying U/Rosser Rodeo) bucked off Gilbert Carrillo at the Bud Light Cup event in Portland, Oregon, and again when Hammer (owned by Tony Sharp and Zaunbrecher) bucked off Cory Rasch at the 2003 Built Ford Tough Series event in Uncasville, Connecticut.

All-time money earners
The all time moneys show off the PBR's claim that they have changed bull riding into a real sport that does more than just pay the riders' fees. PBR bull riders make a true living, and many are millionaires several times over. Two-time world champion J.B. Mauney has earned the most money of any rider at over $7.4 million. He is followed by three-time world champion Silvano Alves at over $6.5 million, and in third place is two-time world champion Jose Vitor Leme with over $5.5 million.

Previous challenges

Mossy Oak Shootout
Starting with the 2000 season, this challenge sponsored by the Mossy Oak camouflage brand was a bonus ride that was featured during first night of each two-day BLC/BFTS event. The Shootout matched up the event's first-round winner against a prearranged bucking bull. The rider had to make a qualified ride to win the Mossy Oak Shootout bonus. In the event that he failed, $5,000 would be added to the bounty, and the new amount would be offered at the next two-day event's Mossy Oak Shootout. The bonus capped out at $100,000, and when a rider made the whistle and collected his bonus, the bounty was then reset to $5,000 at the next event. If the rider made a qualified ride, he was given a score, but those points did not count towards the world standings.

Justin McBride was the first rider to successfully conquer his bull and receive the Mossy Oak Shootout bonus by riding Freckles for $15,000 in Greensboro, North Carolina in 2000. Later that same year, McBride successfully rode Rampage in the Shootout for $30,000 in Houston, Texas. Other notable winners of the Shootout included Chris Shivers who won $5,000 on Dillinger (Fort Worth, Texas; 2000), Chris Shivers again who pocketed $10,000 on Vertigo (Billings, Montana; 2000), Ross Coleman who racked up $100,000 on Tuff-E-Nuff (Columbus, Ohio; 2001), Jim Sharp who banked $85,000 on Dillinger (Fort Worth, Texas; 2002), Owen Washburn who collected $90,000 on Hammer (Bossier City, Louisiana; 2003), Wiley Petersen who netted $20,000 on Ace of Hearts (Billings, Montana; 2003), Cory Melton who secured $35,000 on Werewolf (Laughlin, Nevada; 2003), Ednei Caminhas who earned $65,000 on Red Alert (Tacoma, Washington; 2004), Fabricio Alves who cashed $45,000 on Red Alert (Tacoma, Washington; 2005), and Guilherme Marchi who captured $90,000 on Scene of the Crash (Greensboro, North Carolina; 2006). This challenge was discontinued after 2006.

Ford Truck Moment of Truth
In this challenge sponsored by Ford Trucks which started in 2001 and lasted through 2009, the average leader going into a BLC/BFTS regular-season event’s  Championship Round got a chance to win $5,000. If this leading rider won the event, he also won the "Ford Truck Moment of Truth" bonus money. If the average leader did not win, however, the prize money increased by $5,000. This repeated until a bull rider was successful. After a rider won the money, the whole pool started over again.

Wrangler High Marked Ride
Circa 2003, there was a contest where Wrangler Jeans used to reward the rider with the highest marked ride at the majority of BFTS events. If there was a tie, both riders were awarded.

Ford Super Duty Challenge
From 2005 to 2008, this challenge gave the top 45 bull riders an opportunity to compete for a $1 million bonus. One elite bull rider won a Ford Super Duty pickup truck and one won a $1 million bonus through the achievement of performance milestones. The bull riders competed at seven pre-determined BFTS events. Winners of these events became eligible for incentives. A bull rider who won two or more events became eligible to win the $1 million bonus and had to win the PBR BFTS World Finals event. The bull rider that finished the highest in the event aggregate won the Super Duty truck. Adriano Moraes drove away with the 2005 Ford Super Duty.

Enterprise Rent-A-Car Ride with the Best Bonus
Beginning in 2004, the rider who won the previous BFTS event had a chance to win $5,000 courtesy of Enterprise Rent-A-Car if he successfully covered his bull during the first round of the next BFTS two-day event. If he rode his first round bull, then he had the chance to ride for an additional $5,000 during the second round. 

By 2007, the challenge was modified; the rider who won the previous long round at a regular season BFTS event, regardless if it was a two or three-day event, was offered the chance to win $5,000 if he successfully rode his next long-round bull. If the rider failed to make a qualified ride, the money went to the bull’s stock contractor(s). This challenge was discontinued after 2010.

Cabela's World’s Foremost Ride
From 2005 to 2009, Cabela's paid the rider who scored the highest-marked ride at each BFTS regular-season event a $1,000 bonus.

At the PBR World Finals, Cabela’s awarded $25,000 to the rider who scored the highest-marked ride of the BFTS regular season. If multiple riders tied for the highest-marked ride, the money was split between them. Cabela’s also awarded the riders who scored the second-highest and third-highest marked rides of the BFTS regular season $10,000 and $5,000, respectively. The rider who scored the highest-marked ride of the World Finals was also awarded a $10,000 bonus.

Salem NationaLease High Mark Bull Bonus
From 2007 to 2009, the High Mark Bull Bonus sponsored by Salem NationaLease was paid to the stock contractor of the bull. The bonus was designated to the bull who received the highest bull score at each BFTS event. The bonus amount was a weekly amount of $1,250. The PBR World Finals were excluded.

Zantrex-3 Insta-Shot Grudge Match
Beginning in the middle of the 2008 BFTS season, the rider who won the previous event went up against another BFTS rider of his choice at the next event. Each rider would get on a bull selected by the then-PBR Director of Livestock, Cody Lambert at the end of the event’s regular first round. The rider who successfully rode his bull or the rider who scored more points if both covered their bulls won $5,000 courtesy of Zantrex-3 Insta-Shot. If neither rider covered his bull, the bounty increased by $5,000 at the next BFTS event. If a rider won the money, the bounty reverted back to $5,000 at the following event. This challenge only lasted from the middle to the end of the 2008 BFTS regular season and points won by riders did not count towards the world standings.

Rocky Mountain Elk Foundation (RMEF) Trophy Bull Challenge
From 2009 to 2010, this challenge sponsored by the Rocky Mountain Elk Foundation was added. It was a season long challenge. Cody Lambert selected three bulls from every long round of each BFTS event. If the bull bucked the rider off, the stock contractor received one point. If the rider achieved a successful ride, the rider received a point. The winners of the challenge, the top three riders and stock contractors with the most points received an RMEF outdoor adventure of their choice, which happened at the end of the season.

Champions and awards

Heroes and Legends Celebrations lists the Ring of Honor, Brand of Honor, Sharon Shoulders Award, Jim Shoulders Lifetime Achievement Award, and Ty Murray Top Hand Award. The Ring of Honor for bull riders is equivalent to a hall of fame induction.

See also
 Lists of rodeo performers
 American Bucking Bull
 Bull Riding Hall of Fame
 Professional Rodeo Cowboys Association
 ProRodeo Hall of Fame
 International Professional Rodeo Association
 Bull Riders Only 
 Professional Roughstock Series
 Championship Bull Riding
 Women's Professional Rodeo Association
 Canadian Professional Rodeo Association
 8 Seconds
 Cowboy Up
 The Ride (2010 film)
 The Longest Ride (2015 film)
 Fearless (2016 TV series)

References

Bibliography

External links
 Official sites of Professional Bull Riders, Inc.:
 Official Website
 Canada
 Australia
 Mexico 
 Brazil 
 Professional Bull Riders ticketing information
 Feature story about PBR on Hossli.com
 American Bucking Bull

 
Sports organizations established in 1992
Rodeo organizations
Organizations based in Colorado
Sports in Pueblo, Colorado
Rodeo in the United States
Bucking bulls
Rodeo competition series
Sports in Las Vegas
Bull sports
Professional Bull Riders: Heroes and Legends
Bull riders
Professional sports leagues in the United States